Alexander Dewar Brown (24 March 1939 – 8 April 2014) was a Scottish footballer, best known as an Everton player where he played from 1963 until 1971.

Career 
The Scottish utility man was signed from Partick Thistle for £38,000 in September 1963. Brown had represented the Scottish League earlier that month. The athletic hard man played in several positions. Harry Catterick saw his ability to read the game and played him in front of the back four when it was needed. Against West Ham he was deployed to intercept through balls toward Hurst and Peters.

He was most effective as an overlapping full-back but also played as an emergency attacker and scored against Real Zaragoza in a European game during the 1966–67 season. In fact he played in every position during his Everton career, including goalkeeper. This came after Gordon West was sent off in a game against Newcastle United. He played four games on Everton's way to the 1966 FA Cup Final but didn't play at Wembley and missed out on a winner's medal. He did achieve silverware though, picking up a League Champions medal for the 1969-70 season with Everton.

Arguably his most memorable moment was an own goal scored during the Merseyside Derby in that championship-winning season. Many pundits including Saint and Greavsie celebrated the goal in later years, with Danny Baker referring to it is "the own goal by which all other own goals are surely measured" in his video 'Own Goals and Gaffs'. In total he played 251 games in all competitions for Everton, scoring 11 goals.

After leaving Everton in May 71 he made a further 21 appearances for Shrewsbury. He moved again the next season to Southport and played 19 games during the 1972-73 season. He then moved to Northern Premier League Fleetwood for the 1973-74 season, playing a further 54 games. After he retired from playing football, Brown worked in a biscuit factory. He died in April 2014 following long illness.

References

External links 
 
 Southport FC Player Profile

1939 births
2014 deaths
Everton F.C. players
Fleetwood Town F.C. players
Association football fullbacks
Partick Thistle F.C. players
People from Grangemouth
Scottish Football League players
Scottish footballers
Shrewsbury Town F.C. players
Southport F.C. players
Broxburn Athletic F.C. players
English Football League players
Scottish Football League representative players
Footballers from Falkirk (council area)
Association football utility players
Outfield association footballers who played in goal